Richard Meros is the pseudonym for writer Murdoch Stephens from Wellington, New Zealand. He is best known for the book On the Conditions and Possibilities of Helen Clark Taking Me as Her Young Lover and the theatrical adaptations of his work.

Career
First published in 2005, On the Conditions and Possibilities of Helen Clark Taking Me as Her Young Lover, received favourable reviews in New Zealand and international press. The book, often shortened to OTC&POHCTMAHYL, asked why Helen Clark, the Prime Minister at the time would want a young lover and then why the young lover would be Meros. The book is a work of metafiction as it concludes that the greatest likelihood of Meros being taken as a young lover would be if he wrote a book on the conditions and possibilities of being taken as a young lover. The Guardian described it as 'decidedly lascivious' and the NZ Listener called it a 'mock philosophical treatise' before praising it as 'the underground publishing hit of the decade'.

The book was reissued and adapted into a play of the same name in 2007, touring nationally and was nominated for theatrical performance of the year. For his role as Meros, Arthur Meek was awarded the most promising male newcomer of 2008 at the Chapman Tripp Awards. In 2015, the book was once again adapted into a play that substitutes Hillary Clinton for Helen Clark.

In 2007 Stephens released Richard Meros salutes the Southern Man, a pastoral account of the cultural persona of a male from the south of New Zealand's South Island. This was adapted by the same team that made on the conditions and possibilities of Helen Clark taking me as her Young Lover and toured to positive reviews winning best touring production at the Dunedin Theatre Awards. The book was reissued for the theatrical tour with an introduction by Duncan Sarkies.

In 2008, Stephens released Beggars and Choosers: The Complete Written Correspondence Between Creative New Zealand and Richard Meros volume one which was followed with a second volume titled $30 Meat Pack in 2012.

When Privatising Parts was released in 2011, it was viewed by New Zealand media as a follow up to on the conditions and possibilities of Helen Clark taking me as her Young Lover. This book argued that if the new Prime Minister John Key did not want to lose office he would have to learn the lesson that Helen Clark did not. Meros argues that it was not his reasoning that was ineffective in the first book, but that love, itself was inefficient. He proposed that the government first nationalise love through a State Owned Enterprise and secondly privatise it. This book toured New Zealand and Australia in 2012 and 2013, through a new collaboration with Heleyni Pratley (actor/screenwriter) and Eleanor Bishop (director).

Stephens has released five other books under the Meros pseudonym since 2014 through Lawrence & Gibson in New Zealand, including novels and a textbook, though none have achieved the success of On the conditions and possibilities of Helen Clark taking me as her Young Lover.

He has also written for a wide range of publications in New Zealand from current affairs magazine NZ Listener and daily newspaper the Dominion Post to arts publications White Fungus and Letting Space, literary magazine Hue & Cry, and for the group Political Organisation Aotearoa.

In 2015, Meros was a recipient of Eleanor Catton's Horoeka Grant. In response he wrote the essay 'New Bourgeoizealand' on a politics of lack and abundance in New Zealand.

Pseudonym
Meros is a pseudonym used by Murdoch Stephens, as well as appearing as a character in another of his novels, released under the name  Nestor Notabilis. Prior to the revelation of his identity, it had been speculated that Meros' real persona was either Stephens, actor Arthur Meek or one of the other members of Lawrence & Gibson publishing.

Selected

Novels
 On the Conditions and Possibilities of Helen Clark Taking Me as Her Young Lover Lawrence & Gibson (2005) 
 Richard Meros salutes the Southern Man Lawrence & Gibson (2007) 
 Beggars & Choosers: The Complete Written Correspondence between Richard Meros and Creative New Zealand volume one Lawrence & Gibson (2008) 
 Privatising Parts Lawrence & Gibson (2011) 
 Zebulon: A cautionary tale Lawrence & Gibson (2011) 
 Easy Whistle Solo Lawrence & Gibson (2012) 
 $30 Meat Pack: The Complete Written Correspondence between Richard Meros and Creative New Zealand volume two Lawrence & Gibson (2012) 
 Dating Westerners: tips for the new rich of the developing world Lawrence & Gibson (2014)

Essays
 'On the birth of TEZA' an essay on special economic zones and the TEZA art project.
 'New Bourgeoizealand' an essay for the Horoeka Grant.

References

External links
Author's website
Publisher's page

Year of birth missing (living people)
Living people
People from Wellington City
New Zealand writers
21st-century New Zealand writers
21st-century New Zealand novelists
New Zealand male writers